Uicheon (28 September 1055 – 5 October 1101) was a Goryeo Royal Prince as the fourth son of King Munjong and Queen Inye from the Incheon Yi clan. He was the younger brother of Sunjong, Seonjong, and Sukjong. He was also a writer and Buddhist monk who founded the Cheontae school of Buddhism. He lived at Ryongtongsa in Kaesong for much of his life and was buried there, where his tomb can be found today.

At age 11, he volunteered to become a Buddhist monk. In 1065, he studied at the Yeongtong Temple (영통사, 靈通寺) under Buddhist monk Nanwon (난원, 爛圓) who was his maternal relative and studied the Buddhist and Confucian canons. From 1073 to 1090, he collected Tripiṭaka commentaries from Korea, China, the Khitan Empire and Japan, which were published as the "Goryeo Catalog of Sutras" (or "Goryeo Supplement to the Canon"). He visited the Liao and Song dynasty as a pilgrimage to its Buddhist holy places, met their high priests and listened to their sermons, even became a guksa for Liao's 8th emperor, Yelü Chala before return to his country. After this, Uicheon became the head of many Korean temples at that time.

Works
Sinpyeonjejonggyojangchongnok vol. 3 (신편제종교장총록 3권)
Sinjipwonjongmullyu vol. 22 (신집원종문류, 新集圓宗文類 22권)
Seokwonsarim vol. 250 (석원사림, 釋苑詞林 250권)
Daegakguksamunjib vol. 23 of deeds and poems (대각국사문집, 大覺國師文集 23권 행적과 시 문집)
Daegakguksawoejip vol. 13 (대각국사외집, 大覺國師外集 13권)
Ganjeongseongyusiknondangwa vol. 3 (간정성유식론단과, 刊定成唯識論單科 3권)
Cheontaesagyouiju vol. 3 (천태사교의주, 天台四敎儀註 3권)

See also
 Tiantai Buddhism
 Korean Buddhism
 Cheontae
 Jinul
 Ryongtongsa

References

External links 

 Encyclopædia Britannica

Korean scholars of Buddhism
Goryeo Buddhist monks
1055 births
1101 deaths
11th-century Korean philosophers
11th-century Buddhist monks
Cheontae
People from Kaesong